2022 is the sixth year in the history of Legacy Fighting Alliance, a mixed martial arts promotion based in the United States.

List of events

Legacy Fighting Alliance 121: Brown vs. Jones

Legacy Fighting Alliance 121: Brown vs. Jones is the hundredth-eleventh event of Legacy Fighting Alliance and will take place on January 14, 2022. It aired on UFC Fight Pass.

Background

LFA 121 will also be the celebratory event of the promotion's fifth anniversary and will be headlined by Aaron McKenzie vs Joshua Jones Lightweight bout.

The co-main event of Legacy Fighting Alliance 121st event will feature Elijah Johns vs Brandon Phillips Featherweight bout.

Results

Legacy Fighting Alliance 122: Johnson vs. Mota

Legacy Fighting Alliance 122: Johnson vs. Mota is the hundredth-twelfth event of Legacy Fighting Alliance and will take place on January 21, 2022. It aired on UFC Fight Pass.

Background
The event was headlined by aLFA Flyweight Championship bout between reigning champion Charles Johnson and title challenger Carlos Mota.

Results

Legacy Fighting Alliance 123: Argueta vs. Santos

Legacy Fighting Alliance 123: Argueta vs. Santos is a mixed martial arts event promoted by Legacy Fighting Alliance and will take place on February 4, 2022. It aired on UFC Fight Pass.

Background
A bantamweight bout between Daniel Argueta and Mairon Santos was scheduled as the event headliner.

Results

Legacy Fighting Alliance 124: Formiga vs. Bunes 

Legacy Fighting Alliance 124: Formiga vs. Bunes is a mixed martial arts event promoted by Legacy Fighting Alliance and will take place on February 11, 2022. It aired on UFC Fight Pass.

Background
The event was headliner by a bantamweight bout between Jussier Formiga and Felipe Bunes. The bout was originally scheduled as a flyweight bout, but was bumped up to bantamweight after Formiga missed weight.

Results

Legacy Fighting Alliance 125: Amorim vs. Young

Legacy Fighting Alliance 125: Amorim vs. Young is a mixed martial arts event promoted by Legacy Fighting Alliance and will take place on February 25, 2022. It aired on UFC Fight Pass.

Background
An LFA Women's Strawweight Championship bout for the vacant title between Jaqueline Amorim and Loveth Young was booked as the main event.

Results

Legacy Fighting Alliance 126: Bilharinho vs. Delano

Legacy Fighting Alliance 126: Bilharinho vs. Delano is a mixed martial arts event promoted by Legacy Fighting Alliance and will take place on March 11, 2022. It aired on UFC Fight Pass.

Background
An LFA Featherweight Championship bout for the vacant title between Jonas Bilharinho and Rafael Barbosa was scheduled as the event headliner. Barbosa was later pulled from the bout, after pre-fight exams detected two brain aneurysms.

Results

Legacy Fighting Alliance 127: Diaz vs. Assis

Legacy Fighting Alliance 127: Diaz vs. Assis is a mixed martial arts event promoted by Legacy Fighting Alliance and will take place on March 25, 2022. It aired on UFC Fight Pass.

Background
An LFA Middleweight Championship bout for the vacant title between Ozzy Diaz and Bruno Assis was booked as the event headliner.

Results

Legacy Fighting Alliance 128: McKenzie vs. Clay

Legacy Fighting Alliance 128: McKenzie vs. Clay is a mixed martial arts event promoted by Legacy Fighting Alliance and will take place on April 8, 2022. It aired on UFC Fight Pass.

Background
An LFA Lightweight Championship bout for the vacant title between Aaron McKenzie and Lucas Clay was scheduled as the main event.

Results

Legacy Fighting Alliance 129: Petersen vs. Cortes-Acosta

Legacy Fighting Alliance 129: Petersen vs. Cortes-Acosta is a mixed martial arts event promoted by Legacy Fighting Alliance and will take place on April 15, 2022. It aired on UFC Fight Pass.

Background
A LFA Heavyweight Championship between the reigning champion Thomas Petersen and title challenger Waldo Cortes-Acosta was booked as the event headliner.

Results

Legacy Fighting Alliance 130: Ksiazkiewicz vs. Gambulino

Legacy Fighting Alliance 130: Ksiazkiewicz vs. Gambulino was a mixed martial arts event promoted by Legacy Fighting Alliance, which took place on April 22, 2022. It aired on UFC Fight Pass.

Background
A middleweight bout between Mariusz Ksiazkiewicz and Alessandro Gambulino was scheduled as the main event.

Results

Legacy Fighting Alliance 131: Argueta vs. Silva

Legacy Fighting Alliance 131: Argueta vs. Silva is a mixed martial arts event promoted by Legacy Fighting Alliance and will take place on May 6, 2022. It aired on UFC Fight Pass.

Background
An LFA Bantamweight Championship bout for the vacant title between Daniel Argueta and Diego Silva was booked as the event headliner.

Results

Legacy Fighting Alliance 132: Gomes vs. Costa

Legacy Fighting Alliance 132: Gomes vs. Costa is a mixed martial arts event promoted by Legacy Fighting Alliance and will take place on May 13, 2022. It aired on UFC Fight Pass.

Background
A lightweight bout between Rodrigo Lídio and Italo Gomes was scheduled as the main event.

Results

Legacy Fighting Alliance 133: Stack vs. Delano

Legacy Fighting Alliance 133: Stack vs. Delano is a mixed martial arts event promoted by Legacy Fighting Alliance and will take place on June 3, 2022. It aired on UFC Fight Pass.

Background

Results

Legacy Fighting Alliance 134: Gafurov vs. Sousa

Legacy Fighting Alliance 134: Gafurov vs. Sousa is a mixed martial arts event promoted by Legacy Fighting Alliance and will take place on June 10, 2022. It aired on UFC Fight Pass.

Background
The event was headlined by a bantamweight bout between Muin Gafurov and Herbeth Sousa.

Results

Legacy Fighting Alliance 135: Leyva vs. Reis

Legacy Fighting Alliance 135: Leyva vs. Reis is a mixed martial arts event promoted by Legacy Fighting Alliance and will take place on July 8, 2022. It aired on UFC Fight Pass.

Background

Results

Legacy Fighting Alliance 136: Rio de Janeiro vs. São Paulo

Legacy Fighting Alliance 136: Rio de Janeiro vs. São Paulo is a mixed martial arts event promoted by Legacy Fighting Alliance and will take place on July 15, 2022. It aired on UFC Fight Pass.

Background

Results

Legacy Fighting Alliance 137: Gibson vs. Amil

Legacy Fighting Alliance 137: Gibson vs. Amil is a mixed martial arts event promoted by Legacy Fighting Alliance and will take place on July 29, 2022. It aired on UFC Fight Pass.

Background
The event was headlined by a featherweight bout between Chase Gibson and Hyder Amil.

Results

Legacy Fighting Alliance 138: Farias vs. Tanaka

Legacy Fighting Alliance 138: Farias vs. Tanaka is a mixed martial arts event promoted by Legacy Fighting Alliance and will take place on August 5, 2022. It aired on UFC Fight Pass.

Background
The event was headlined by a bantamweight bout between Ary Farias and five-time UFC veteran Michinori Tanaka.

Results

Legacy Fighting Alliance 139: Assenza vs. Melo

Legacy Fighting Alliance 139: Assenza vs. Melo is a mixed martial arts event promoted by Legacy Fighting Alliance and will take place on August 19, 2022. It aired on UFC Fight Pass.

Background

Results

Legacy Fighting Alliance 140: Mota vs. Abuev

Legacy Fighting Alliance 140: Mota vs. Abuev is a mixed martial arts event promoted by Legacy Fighting Alliance and will take place on August 26, 2022. It aired on UFC Fight Pass.

Background

Results

Legacy Fighting Alliance 141: Talundžić vs. Brown

Legacy Fighting Alliance 141: Talundžić vs. Brown is a mixed martial arts event promoted by Legacy Fighting Alliance and will take place on September 9, 2022. It aired on UFC Fight Pass.

Background
LFA 141 was headlined by a welterweight bout between Haris Talundžić and Chris Brown.

Results

Legacy Fighting Alliance 142: Amorim vs. Nichols

Legacy Fighting Alliance 142: Amorim vs. Nichols is a mixed martial arts event promoted by Legacy Fighting Alliance and will take place on September 16, 2022. It aired on UFC Fight Pass.

Background
A LFA Women's Strawweight Championship bout between champion Jaqueline Amorim and title challenger Ashley Nichols was scheduled as the main event.

Results

Legacy Fighting Alliance 143: Lopes vs. Paiva

Legacy Fighting Alliance 143: Lopes vs. Paiva is a mixed martial arts event promoted by Legacy Fighting Alliance and will take place on September 30, 2022. It aired on UFC Fight Pass.

Background
A LFA Light Heavyweight Championship bout for the vacant title between Bruno Lopes and Willyanedson Paiva was booked as the main event. An interim LFA Women's Flyweight Championship bout between Gabriella Hermógenes and Karoline Martins served as the co-main event.

Results

Legacy Fighting Alliance 144: Gafurov vs. Silva

Legacy Fighting Alliance 144: Gafurov vs. Silva is a mixed martial arts event promoted by Legacy Fighting Alliance and will take place on October 14, 2022. It aired on UFC Fight Pass.

Background

Results

Legacy Fighting Alliance 145: Assis vs. Murray

Legacy Fighting Alliance 145: Assis vs. Murray was a mixed martial arts event promoted by Legacy Fighting Alliance and took place on October 21, 2022. It aired on UFC Fight Pass.

Background

Results

Legacy Fighting Alliance 146: Barbosa vs. Santos

Legacy Fighting Alliance 146: Barbosa vs. Santos is a mixed martial arts event promoted by Legacy Fighting Alliance and will take place on November 4, 2022. It aired on UFC Fight Pass.

Background
The event was headlined by a featherweight bout between Márcio Barbosa and the undefeated Gabriel Santos.

Results

Legacy Fighting Alliance 147: Melo vs. Costa

Legacy Fighting Alliance 147: Melo vs. Costa is a mixed martial arts event promoted by Legacy Fighting Alliance and will take place on November 18, 2022. It aired on UFC Fight Pass.

Background
The event was headlined by a lightweight bout between Junior Melo and Melquizael Costa.

Results

Legacy Fighting Alliance 148: Leyva vs. Brown

Legacy Fighting Alliance 148: Leyva vs. Brown is a mixed martial arts event promoted by Legacy Fighting Alliance and will take place on December 9, 2022. It aired on UFC Fight Pass.

Background

Fight card

See also
 2022 in UFC
 2022 in Bellator MMA
 2022 in ONE Championship
 2022 in Absolute Championship Akhmat
 2022 in Konfrontacja Sztuk Walki
 2022 in Rizin Fighting Federation
 2022 in AMC Fight Nights 
 2022 in Brave Combat Federation
 2022 in Road FC
 2022 Professional Fighters League season
 2022 in Eagle Fighting Championship

References

External links
  Legacy Fighting Alliance Official website

  
2022 sport-related lists 
2022 in mixed martial arts